Lewis Norman Dodak (born April 12, 1946) is a lobbyist and former member of the Michigan House of Representatives who served as its Speaker from 1989 to 1992.

Dodak has been granted three honorary doctorates: two of law from Saginaw Valley State University and Michigan Technological University and one of public affairs from Northern Michigan University. With fellow former Speaker Rick Johnson, Dodak is a partner at the firm Dodak Johnson and Associates.

References

Living people
Speakers of the Michigan House of Representatives
Place of birth missing (living people)
1946 births
20th-century American politicians